The women's 1500 metres event  at the 1981 European Athletics Indoor Championships was held on 22 February.

Results

References

1500 metres at the European Athletics Indoor Championships
1500
Euro